Petrophile multisecta, commonly known as Kangaroo Island conesticks, is a species of flowering plant in the family Proteaceae and is endemic to Kangaroo Island in South Australia. It is a prickly shrub with rigid, much-divided leaves with sharply pointed tips, oval to spherical heads of hairy cream-coloured flowers and oval fruit.

Description

Taxonomy
Petrophile multisecta was first formally described in 1868 by Ferdinand von Mueller in Fragmenta Phytographiae Australiae. The specific epithet (multisecta) means "much-divided, referring to the leaves.

Distribution and habitat
Kangaroo Island conesticks grows in lateritic or calcareous sand and is common on Kangaroo Island where it is endemic.

References

multisecta
Flora of South Australia
Plants described in 1868
Taxa named by Ferdinand von Mueller